Château de Châtillon may refer to:

Château de Châtillon-Coligny, a castle in Châtillon-Coligny, Loiret, France
Château de Châtillon-d'Azergues, a castle in Châtillon, Rhône, France
Château de Châtillon-sur-Chalaronne, a castle in Châtillon-sur-Chalaronne, Ain, France